Ships of the United States Navy known as USS Mystic:

 , in service 1858–1865

Other US Navy ships named Mystic:
 

United States Navy ship names